Wicked may refer to:

Books
 Wicked, a minor character in the X-Men universe
 Wicked, a 1995 novel by Gregory Maguire that inspired the musical of the same name
 Wicked, the fifth novel in Sara Shepard's Pretty Little Liars series
 Wicked, a young adult novel series written by Nancy Holder and Debbie Viguié
 Wicked, a 1997 novel series collaboration between Australian children's authors Paul Jennings and Morris Gleitzman

Film, television and stage 
Wicked (musical), a 2003 musical based on the 1995 Gregory Maguire novel
 Wicked (1931 film), a musical film starring Bailey Morley and Victor McLaglen
 The Wicked (1991 film), Italian film directed by Carlo Lizzani
 Wicked (1998 film), a 1998 film starring Julia Stiles
 Wicked! (TV series), a 2000 Australian animated series
 The Wicked (2013 film), American film directed by Peter Winther
 Wicked: Part One and Wicked: Part Two, an upcoming two-part film adaptation of the musical 
 Wicked, Wicked, a 1973 horror-thriller feature film that was presented in "Duo-Vision"
 Wicked Pictures, an American pornographic studio

Music

Albums
 Wicked (musical album), songs from the musical
 Wicked! (Scooter album), a 1996 album by Scooter
 Wicked (Sinitta album), a 1989 studio album by American singer Sinitta
 Wicked (Barb Jungr and Michael Parker album), a 1986 album by Barb Jungr and Michael Parker
 W.I.C.K.E.D., a 2009 album by rap duo Twiztid

Songs
 "Wicked" (Ice Cube song), a 1992 song by rap artist Ice Cube
 "Wicked" (Future song), a 2016 song by Future
 "Wicked", a song on Greg Dulli's 2005 album Amber Headlights
 "Wicked", a song by Symphony X from The Odyssey
 "W.I.C.K.E.D.", a 2009 song from the eponymous album W.I.C.K.E.D.

Other uses 
 Wicked (roller coaster), a launched steel roller coaster located at Lagoon Amusement Park in Farmington, Utah
 Wicked (video game), developed by Binary Vision Ltd. and released on Amiga, Atari ST and Commodore 64 in 1989
 WICKED, a fictional organization in the novel and film series The Maze Runner

See also
 Wickedness
 Wicked problem
 The Wicked Lady (disambiguation)